DM is the third studio album by Mexican singer and songwriter Dulce María, released on March 10, 2017 through the Universal Music Latin Entertainment. Completed in August 2016, the album was originally intended to be released in its recording year but was postponed until 2017. Produced by Ettore Grenci, Andres Saavedra and Predikador, it was recorded during sessions that took place in Los Angeles in 2016 and Mexico City. The title of the album was revealed on December 16, 2016, during a Facebook Live stream.

Singles
The lead single from the album is "No Sé Llorar", an electropop ballad written by América Angélica Jiménez and Ximena Muñoz and produced by Ettore Grenci. The track was released on April 29, 2016, receiving positive reviews about the maturity present in the theme along with the vocal and musical evolution of María in relation to her previous works.

The second single from the album, "Volvamos", which features Panamanian singer Joey Montana, was released on September 23, 2016. The song was composed by Joey and Andrés Saavedra and produced by Predikador.

"Rompecorazones", a ballad composed by Dulce, Andre Torres, Mauricio Rengifo and Julio Reyes, was released a week before the album's release on March 3 as the album's third single.

Charts

Track listing

References

2017 albums
Dulce María albums